Daniel John Fitzgerald (born August 12, 1984) is a retired professional basketball player who last played for Oviedo CB.

College statistics

|-
| style="text-align:left;"| 2003–04
| style="text-align:left;"| Tulane
|28||3  ||14.8  ||.600 || .291 || .625  ||1.82  ||0.96 || 0.54 || 0.14 || 4.18
|-
| style="text-align:left;"| 2005–06
| style="text-align:left;"| Marquette
|31  || 7 || 19.9 ||.479 ||.394  ||.724||2.42  ||1.65 || 0.65 || 0.19 || 5.26
|-
| style="text-align:left;"| 2006–07 
| style="text-align:left;"|Marquette
| 34 || 11 || 21.7 || .483 || .423 || .762|| 3.88 ||  0.71|| 0.44 || 0.12 || 7.41
|-
| style="text-align:left;"| 2007–08
| style="text-align:left;"| Marquette
| 29|| 4 || 14.5 ||.412 || .379 || .769 ||2.00  ||0.34 ||0.72  || 0.00 || 4.38
|-
|- class="sortbottom"
! style="text-align:center;" colspan=2|  Career

!122 ||25 || 17.9 ||.471 || .378 ||.716  || 2.59||0.92  || 0.58 ||0.11  || 5.40
|-

Professional career
Fitzgerald started his career with German league club Ratiopharm Ulm.

During the 2012–13 season, he played for the Japanese team Akita Northern Happinets.  In the summer of 2013, he returned to SAM Massagno, but he only played one game with them before transferring to Spain in October 2013 to play with Oviedo CB of the LEB Oro.

Career statistics

NBA Summer League Stats

|-
| align="left" |  2008–09
| align="left" | MIN
| 3|| 0||6.6  ||.333  || .000 || .000 || 1.0 || 0.00 || 0.33 ||0.00  ||0.67
|-

Regular season

|-
| align="left" |  2008–09
| align="left" | Ulm
| 37|| 2||18.9  ||.385  || .370 || .702 || 2.43 || 0.65 || 0.57 ||0.16  ||7.95
|-
| align="left" |  2009–10
| align="left" | SAM
| 30||    ||31.6  ||.478  || .410 || .827 || 3.5 || 1.4 || 1.5 ||0.1  ||14.7
|-
| align="left" |  2010–11
| align="left" | Ulm
| 10|| 0||15.4  ||.468  || .413 || .600 || 1.00 || 0.50 || 0.20 ||0.00  ||8.30
|-
| align="left" |  2011–12
| align="left" | Sendai
| 50|| 48||32.7  ||.410  || .346 || .834 || 6.2 || 1.4 || 1.5 ||0.3  ||18.9
|-
| align="left" | 2012–13
| align="left" | Obras/SAM
| 14 ||2  || 15.8 || .443 || .440 || 1.000 || 2.43 || 0.50 || 0.29 || 0.07 || 6.93
|-
| align="left" | 2012–13
| align="left" | Akita
| 16 ||  || 19.2 || .226 || .187 || .838 || 5.2 || 1.1 || 0.6 || 0.1 || 7.3
|-
| align="left" | 2013–14
| align="left" | Oviedo
| 14 ||2  || 18.1 || .487 || .442 || .773 || 2.93 || 0.36 ||0.57 || 0.07 || 8.43
|-

Playoffs 

|-
|style="text-align:left;"|2008–09
|style="text-align:left;"|Ulm
| 3 ||  || 15.7 || .167 || .000 || .800 || 1.7 || 0.3 || 0.0 || 0.3 || 2.7
|-
|style="text-align:left;"|2011–12
|style="text-align:left;"|Sendai
| 2 ||  || 33.5 || .250 || .308 || .750 || 4.5 || 1.0 || 0.5 || 0.0 || 8.5
|-

See also
 Golden Eagles (TBT)

References

External links
Profile at Sports-reference
Profile at Spanish Basketball Federation

1984 births
Living people
Akita Northern Happinets players
American expatriate basketball people in Argentina
American expatriate basketball people in Germany
American expatriate basketball people in Japan
American expatriate basketball people in Spain
American expatriate basketball people in Switzerland
Basketball players from Minnesota
Marquette Golden Eagles men's basketball players
Obras Sanitarias basketball players
Oviedo CB players
Ratiopharm Ulm players
Sendai 89ers players
Tulane Green Wave men's basketball players
American men's basketball players
Power forwards (basketball)